"Mike" is a song recorded by Albanian singer and songwriter Elvana Gjata and Kosovo-Albanian rapper Ledri Vula featuring Albanian singer John Shahu. It was composed and written by the aforementioned artists together with Arber Zeqo and produced by Arbre Blass. The official music video was uploaded onto YouTube in July 2018.

Background and composition 

Having a duration time of three minutes and twenty three seconds, "Mike" was musically described as an Albanian-language pop song incorporating Balkan elements. Lyrically, the song explores the theme of an adolescent romance that is predetermined despite the long distances. It was composed and written by Elvana Gjata, Ledri Vula, John Shahu together with Albanian producer Arber Zeqo. Albanian producer Arbre Blass was additionally hired for the song's production process. According to the latter, it took approximately 250 hours for the complementation of the song.

Critical reception 

Music critics gave generally positive responses of "Mike" following its release. An editor of SoundsEuropean was positive towards the singers vocals and song's nature labeling it a "fresh song with a catchy melody". Radio Ferizaj was positive towards Elvana's, Ledri's and Shahu's vocal parts further calling the music video as "phenomenal".

Music video and promotion 

An accompanying music video for the song was officially premiered to the YouTube channel of Elvana Gjata, two days before the digital and to streaming release on 2 July 2018. Filmed in Palermo, Italy, it was directed by Besian Durmishi and produced by Adea Kelmendi. East Music Matters released it on digital platforms and streaming services as a single on 4 July 2018.

Personnel 

Credits adapted from Tidal and YouTube.

 Elvana Gjatacomposing, songwriting, vocals
 Ledri Vulacomposing, songwriting, vocals
 John Shahucomposing, songwriting, vocals
 Arber Zeqosongwriting
 Arbre Blassproduction
 Besian Durmishivideo directing
 Adea Kelmendivideo production

Charts

Release history

References 

2018 singles
2018 songs
Elvana Gjata songs
Ledri Vula songs
Albanian-language songs
Songs written by Elvana Gjata
Songs written by Ledri Vula
Music videos directed by Besian Durmishi